Carijona (Karihona) is a Cariban language, or probably a pair of languages, of Colombia. Derbyshire (1999) lists the varieties Hianacoto-Umaua and Carijona proper as separate languages.

References

Languages of Colombia
Cariban languages
Endangered indigenous languages of the Americas